Mary Boyle, Countess of Cork and Orrery (21 May 1746 – 30 May 1840) was an Anglo-Irish literary hostess.

Life
Born Mary Monckton, probably at Serlby Hall, Nottinghamshire, the family seat, she was a daughter of John Monckton, 1st Viscount Galway by his second wife, Jane Westenra of Rathleagh, Queen's County, Ireland. Boswell places Mary Monckton among the bluestocking clubs, and writes:

The playwright Richard Brinsley Sheridan was a close friend and regular visitor: in the 1780 general election he stood jointly in the Whig interest with Mary's brother Edward and was elected 2nd Member for Stafford. In 1786, she became the second wife of Edmund Boyle, 7th Earl of Cork and 7th Earl of Orrery. Politically, there was never any doubt of her sympathies: although brother Edward wavered, Mary still signed herself "a True Whig" into old age.

Several of the historical novels of Georgette Heyer refer to the fame of her literary parties, and the crucial role which wit and good conversation played there: a character remarks that the highest praise a hostess can dream of is to be called "a second Lady Cork".

She died in London on 30 May 1840. She was ninety-four. She was buried in Brewood parish church, Staffordshire, close to the estates of her brother, Edward Monckton.

Sources

Attribution
 

Daughters of viscounts
Irish countesses
1746 births
1840 deaths
Mary
British salon-holders